Hui Zhang is a professor of pathology at Johns Hopkins University. She specializes in analysis of glycoproteins and other protein modifications on the proteome scale. Her most cited article is Identification and quantification of N-linked glycoproteins using hydrazide chemistry, stable isotope labeling and mass spectrometry.

Zhang earned her B.S. and M.S. from Peking University, and her Ph.D. from the University of Pennsylvania.

References

Further reading
Zhang H, Liu T, Zhang Z, Payne SH, Zhang B, McDermott JE, Zhou J, Petyuk VA, Chen L, Ray D, Sun S, Yang F, Chen L, Wang J, Shah P, Cha S-W, Aiyetan P, Woo S, Tian Y, Gritsenko MA, Choi C, Monroe ME, Thomas S, Moore RJ, Yu K-H, Tabb DL, FenyoÌˆ D, Bafna V, Wang Y, Rodriguez H, Boja ES, Hiltke T, Rivers RC, Sokoll L, Zhu H, Shih I-M, Pandey A, Zhang B, Snyder MP, Levine DA, Smith RD, Chan DW, Rodland KD, and the CPTAC investigators. Deep proteogenomic characterization of human ovarian cancer. Cell. 2016; 166: 755–765.
Sun S, Shah P, Toghi Eshghi S, Yang W, Trikannad N, Yang S, Chen L, Aiyetan P, Hoti NU, Zhang Z, Chan DW, Zhang H*. Comprehensive analysis of protein glycosylation by solid-phase extraction of N-linked glycans and glycosite-containing peptides. Nature Biotechnology. 2016; 34: 84-88
Shah P, Wang X, Yang W, Toghi Eshghi S, Sun S, Hoti N, Pasay J, Rubin A, Zhang H*. Integrated proteomic and glycoproteomic analyses of prostate cancer cells reveals glycoprotein alteration in protein abundance and glycosylation. Molecular & Cellular Proteomics. 2015; 14: 2753–2763.
Toghi Eshghi S, Shah P, Yang W, Li X, Zhang H*. GPQuest: A Spectral Library Matching Algorithm for Site-Specific Assignment of Spectra from Tandem Mass Spectrometric Analysis of Intact Glycopeptides. Analytical Chemistry. 2015; 87: 5181–5188.
Zhang, H., Li, X. J., Martin, D. B., and Aebersold, R. Identification and quantification of N-linked glycoproteins using hydrazide chemistry, stable isotope labeling and mass spectrometry. Nature Biotechnology (2003) 21:660.
Zhang, H., Zha, X., Tan, Y., Hornbeck, P. V., Mastrangelo, A. J., Alessi, D. R., Polakiewicz, R. D., and Comb, M. J. Phosphoprotein analysis using antibodies broadly reactive against phosphorylated motifs. Journal of Biological Chemistry (2002) 277:39379.

Living people
20th-century births
Year of birth missing (living people)
American pathologists
Chinese pathologists
American women biologists
Chinese women biologists
Chinese emigrants to the United States
Peking University alumni
University of Pennsylvania alumni
American women academics
21st-century American women scientists
Johns Hopkins School of Medicine faculty